is a railway station in the city of Yatomi, Aichi Prefecture, Japan, operated by Meitetsu.

Lines

Station layout
The station has one side platform, serving a single bi-directional track.  The platform is short, and can handle trains of four carriages in length. The station has automated ticket machines, Manaca automated turnstiles and is unattended.

Adjacent stations

|-
!colspan=5|Meitetsu

Station history
Gonosan Station was opened on October 1, 1924 as a station on the Bisai Railway, which was acquired by Meitetsu on August 1, 1925. A new station building was completed in March 2006.

Surrounding area
Japan National Route 155

See also
 List of Railway Stations in Japan

References

External links

 Official web page 

Railway stations in Japan opened in 1924
Railway stations in Aichi Prefecture
Stations of Nagoya Railroad
Yatomi, Aichi